USS McCormick (DD-223/AG-118) was a Clemson-class destroyer in the United States Navy during World War II. She was named for Lieutenant, junior grade Alexander McCormick, Jr.

Construction and commissioning
McCormick was laid down 11 August 1919 by William Cramp & Sons; launched 14 February 1920; sponsored by Miss Katherine McCormick, sister of Lieutenant (jg.) McCormick; and commissioned 30 August 1920, Lieutenant Commander Louis C. Scheibla in command..

Service history
Following shakedown, McCormick served a year with Destroyer Squadron 5, Pacific Fleet. She then returned to the United States East Coast for deployment with Destroyer Detachment, U. S. Naval Forces in European Waters. There she served in a quasi-diplomatic capacity in the eastern Mediterranean until the spring of 1924, after successful negotiations for a peace treaty between the Allies and Turkey.

The following year, she was assigned to the Asiatic Fleet. Operating from Cavite, she served as flagship for DesDiv 39, later 14, in support of the Yangtze River Patrol and South China Patrol until 1932. On 15 March she was ordered back to the United States and home ported at San Diego, where she decommissioned 14 October 1938.

World War II
The following year, as hostilities in Europe broke out; McCormick was brought out of the Inactive Reserve. Recommissioned 26 September 1939, she was assigned to Neutrality Patrol in the Atlantic. The entry of the U.S. into the worldwide conflict brought only an increase in antisubmarine activities for the destroyer as she continued her voyages to Iceland and across the Atlantic.

Through the end of 1942, McCormick plied the North Atlantic on runs to Halifax, NS Argentia, and Londonderry Port. Shifting southward, 7 February 1943, she escorted convoys bound for Casablanca. But before Santee departed the area, four U-boats were discovered in the convoy's vicinity. On the last date, McCormick picked up three survivors from U-67 for later transferral.

McCormick returned to New York 24 July and continued to escort convoys until 5 December. She then joined , TG 27.4, for a quick voyage to Casablanca and back, before overhaul at New York.

The destroyer's next assignment sent her to Natal, Brazil, and then Casablanca, escorting . On 1 April 1944, she was ordered to Boston, Massachusetts to resume escort and antisubmarine patrol duties. In May, McCormick returned to transatlantic convoy duty with a run to North Africa. During the next 4 months, she touched at various ports, including Bizerte, Oran, Cherbourg, Falmouth, Belfast, and Milford Haven. Upon her return to Boston, 1 October, she spent 3 months in convoy and patrol operations off the U.S. East Coast and in the Caribbean before shifting back to the Casablanca run in January 1945.

Convoys escorted

Auxiliary service
On 31 March, McCormick departed Norfolk for temporary duty with SubRon 3 at Balboa, Panama Canal Zone. On 30 June 1945, she was reclassified miscellaneous auxiliary, AG-118, while at the Canal Zone. Two weeks later, she got underway for overhaul at Boston, arriving 21 July. Still undergoing repairs when peace came, McCormick decommissioned 4 October 1945. Her name was struck from the Navy list 24 October 1945 and her hulk was sold for scrapping to Boston Metals Company, Baltimore, Maryland, 15 December 1946.

As of 2005, no other U.S. Navy ship has been named McCormick. The USS Lynde McCormick DDG(8), a Charles F. Adams-Class destroyer was commissioned June 3, 1961. It was named after Admiral Lynde D. McCormick.

References

External links
http://www.navsource.org/archives/05/223.htm

Clemson-class destroyers
World War II destroyers of the United States
Ships built by William Cramp & Sons
1920 ships